Redd Volkaert (born 1958) originally from Canada, is widely regarded as one of the greatest guitar players in the modern era and is "among the country’s top Telecaster guitar slingers." particularly in the genres of Western Swing and Honky Tonk.  He has been the go-to picker for Merle Haggard and has a history playing with the likes of Johnny Paycheck and George Jones.  Redd can often be found on stage in the company of his fellow Telecaster stalwart Bill Kirchen formerly of Commander Cody and the Lost Planet Airmen.  Together they are often referred to as the "Titans of the Telecaster" such is their ability and notoriety, love and connection with this particular instrument.  

Redd cut his teeth playing clubs 6 nights a week at 16 til the mid 1980’s in Canada and moved to Los Angeles in 1986.  There he worked clubs, private gigs at night and gave guitar lessons and recording during the day. He regularly travelled to Las Vegas to play show rooms and casinos.

Redd moved to Nashville in 1990 to play full time clubs seven nights a week on Broadway, Printers Alley and around town and 1 or 2 shifts a day between recording sessions most days, periodically traveling with road bands filling in as a substitute for guitarists in bands such as: Johnny Paycheck, George Jones, Statler Brothers, Rhonda Vincent etc. as well as on the Grand Ole Opry
He joined Merle Haggard's band in ‘97 while continuing to record with other folks like Brad Paisley garnering a 2009 Grammy for Best Country Instrumental Performance.  In 2000 Redd moved to Austin Texas where he held a residency at the Continental Club for 20 yrs with his own band on Saturday afternoons, and Sunday nights with Heybale!  He continued to tour extensively with Merle as well as his own band in between tours

While best known as a Fender Telecaster player, with a personal collection that includes a 1953 Fender Telecaster, a 1951 Fender Nocaster, a 1958 Fender Esquire. Volkaert has lent his name to guitars made by other companies, including Asher.

Redd relocated to SW Virginia in 2020 in time for Covid lockdown, recording and giving Skype lessons during that year and a half and has been back playing/ recording & traveling in the US and abroad as of May 2021

Discography

References

External links
 Guitarist Redd Volkaert Talks About Telecasters, Austin and Chihuahuas
 Artist Picture Blog Redd Volkaert – Ace Guitarist from Austin

Canadian country guitarists
Canadian male guitarists
Canadian session musicians
Living people
1958 births